Uncle Howard is a 2016 documentary film about filmmaker Howard Brookner directed by Aaron Brookner.

Synopsis
Director Howard Brookner died of AIDS in NYC in 1989 while in post-production on his breakthrough Hollywood movie. His body of work has been buried for 30 years in William S. Burroughs' bunker until his nephew Aaron Brookner unearths his story and the memory of everything he was.

Production
Production of Uncle Howard began in 2012 when Aaron Brookner began to search for the missing print of Burroughs: The Movie and Howard Brookner's wider archives. The search yielded the print of Burroughs: The Movie (which, following a Kickstarter campaign, was digitally remastered and was subsequently re-released by The Criterion Collection and Janus Films), as well as a wide range of archives that reveal the story of Howard Brookner's life and work.

In February 2013 Uncle Howard (then called Smash The Control Machine) was presented in the Berlinale Talent Project Market, whereupon Jim Jarmusch was announced as executive producer. Aaron Brookner continued to shoot the project through until 2014, up until the special revival screening of Burroughs: The Movie at the New York Film Festival, which united many friends and colleagues of Howard Brookner. Aaron Brookner, Jim Jarmusch, Tom DiCillo, and James Grauerholz took part in a Q&A at the event.

Soundtrack 
The film's soundtrack includes songs by Duke Ellington, Lotte Lenya, Vision Fortune, Lightspeed Champion, Josef Van Wissem, Mogwai, Younghusband, Grimm Grimm, The Pretenders and NEU!. The movie had Barry Hogan, founder of ATP, as a consultant and Frederic Schindler as music supervisor.

Release
On December 2, 2015, it was announced that Uncle Howard would premiere in the US Documentary Competition category at the 2016 Sundance Film Festival. It has also been selected to be screened in the Panorama section of the 66th Berlin International Film Festival.

Critical reception
On review aggregator website Rotten Tomatoes, the film holds an approval rating of 91% based on 22 reviews, and an average rating of 6.8/10. On Metacritic, the film has a weighted average score of 73 out of 100, based on 8 critics, indicating "generally favorable reviews".

References

External links
 
 Uncle Howard on Facebook
 Uncle Howard IFP Fiscal Sponsorship page

2016 films
2016 documentary films
American documentary films
Documentary films about film directors and producers
2010s English-language films
2010s American films